A referendum on the electoral law was held in San Marino on 3 July 2005. Voters were asked four questions on changes to the electoral law and electoral system. Although all four were approved by a majority of those voting, voter turnout was just 21.7%, meaning that the quorum of 32% of registered voters (10,143) was not achieved for any question. This resulted in all four questions failing, including two that proposed raising the quorum to 40%.

Results

Question I

Question II

Question III

Question IV

References

2005 referendums
Referendums in San Marino
2005 in San Marino
July 2005 events in Europe